The 1993 UCI Road World Championships took place in Oslo, Norway between 28–29 August 1993.

Events summary

Medals table

References

 
UCI Road World Championships by year
World Championships
Uci Road World Championships, 1993
R
Cycling
Cycle racing in Norway
UCI Road World Championships
UCI Road World Championships, 1993